The Natural Seven is an album by saxophonist, composer and arranger Al Cohn recorded in 1955 for the RCA Victor label.

Reception

The AllMusic review by Scott Yanow stated "Although originally associated with Woody Herman and cool jazz, Cohn always felt equally comfortable playing with swing-styled players. His "Natural Seven" looks toward the Kansas City Seven and includes two members of Count Basie's band".

Track listing
All compositions by Al Cohn except as indicated
 "A Kiss to Build a Dream On" (Bert Kalmar, Harry Ruby, Oscar Hammerstein II) – 3:34
 "Doggin' Around" (Edgar Battle, Herschel Evans) – 3:04
 "Jump the Blues Away" (Ed Lewis) – 3:01
 "Jack's Kinda Swing" – 3:39
 "The Natural Thing to Do" – 3:03
 "A.C. Meets Osie" – 2:49
 "Baby Please" – 3:07
 "9:20 Special" (Earle Warren, Jack Palmer, William Engvick) – 3:01 	
 "Pick a Dilly" – 3:34
 "Count Me In" – 3:37
 "Freddie's Tune" (Freddie Green) – 3:29
 "Osie's Blues" (Manny Albam, Osie Johnson) – 2:30

Personnel 
Al Cohn – tenor saxophone
Joe Newman – trumpet
Frank Rehak – trombone
Nat Pierce – piano
Freddie Green – guitar
Milt Hinton – bass
Osie Johnson – drums, vocal
Manny Albam (tracks 1, 3, 8 & 12), Al Cohn (tracks 4-7 & 9-11), Ernie Wilkins (track 2) – arranger

References 

1955 albums
RCA Records albums
Al Cohn albums
Albums arranged by Manny Albam
Albums arranged by Ernie Wilkins